Strudiella devonica is a species of extinct arthropod from Devonian, originally described as the first complete Late Devonian terrestrial insect. It was recovered in the Strud (Gesves, Belgium) environment from the Bois des Mouches Formation, Upper Famennian. It had unspecialized, 'orthopteroid', mouthparts, indicating an omnivorous diet.

This discovery reduces a previous gap of 45 million years in the evolutionary history of insects, part of the arthropod gap (the 'gap' still occurs in the early Carboniferous, coinciding and extending past the Romer's gap for tetrapods, which may have been caused by low oxygen levels in the atmosphere). Body segments, legs and antennae are visible; however, genitalia were not preserved. The specimen has no wings, but it may be a juvenile.

Later study shows extra legs, and based on its poor state of preservation, its interpretation as an insect is unwarranted.

See also 
 Evolution of insects

References

External links 
 

 

Prehistoric insect genera
Insects described in 2012
Fossil taxa described in 2012
Late Devonian animals
Famennian life
Fossils of Belgium
Evolution of insects
Taxa named by Michael S. Engel

Controversial taxa